California Senate Bill 35 (SB 35) is a statute streamlining housing construction in California counties and cities that fail to build enough housing to meet state mandated housing construction requirements. The bill was introduced to the California State Assembly by State Senator Scott Wiener (D-SF) on December 15, 2016. SB 35 aims to address the California housing shortage by increasing housing supply. The bill was signed into law on September 29, 2017 by Governor Jerry Brown as part of California’s 2017 Housing Package – a set of 15 bills that provide “an injection of new regulatory and financial resources” for cities.

Scott Wiener introduced SB 35 to increase housing supply in cities that are not producing enough housing, by encouraging cities to either increase housing development on their own or be forced to accept housing development. After the bill’s passage, Wiener claimed: “SB 35 will retain local control for those cities that are producing their share of housing, but create a more streamlined path for housing creation in those cities that are blocking housing or ignoring their responsibility to build.”

In 2021 AB1174 was signed into law, which gives projects using the special approval of SB35 more time to start construction to compensate for delays caused by lawsuits.

Provisions 
SB 35 requires cities include comprehensive rental market information in their biyearly housing element report and allows developers to submit an application subject to streamlined approval processes in municipalities not meeting Regional Housing Needs Assessments (RHNA).

The development must: 
be on land zoned for residential use.
designate at least 10% of units as below market housing if located in localities that did not meet above-moderate income RHNA.
designate at least 50% of units as below market housing in localities that did not meet low income RHNA.
not be constructed in an ecologically protected area.
be multi-unit housing and not single family homes.
pay construction workers union-level wages.
If the development meets all state mandated criteria, localities must approve the project in either 60 days if the development contains less than 150 housing units or 90 days if the development contains more than 150 units of housing.
Cities will submit their housing construction progress to the California Department of Housing and Community Development (HCD) every 2 years. If the city fails to meet its RHNA goals at one of these progress checks, streamlining will be in effect for the entire next two-year cycle. SB 35 applies only to the specific income levels not being built for. For example, if a city is building enough market-rate units to meet its RHNA but not enough low-income units, the project can only add low-income units to qualify for quickened approval.

Background 

California housing costs are among the most unaffordable in the United States. In 2018, the median San Jose home cost 10 times the median household income; Los Angeles homes cost 9.5 times; San Francisco homes cost 8.9 times; San Diego homes cost 8.1 times. California is the most expensive state to rent in, in the United States.

California has had a housing shortage since 1970 and ranks 49th among 50 states for housing units per capita.   The problem has worsened following the Great Recession as housing development fell to 40,000 units in 2009 and has not reached pre-recession levels. California needs approximately 180,000 units per year to match current growth. Slow housing development combined with high housing demand has increased housing costs in every city in California.

The state’s high rent prices have translated into increased homelessness, more households spending half their income on housing, and an exodus of low and middle income households leaving to states with lower cost of living. The housing shortage negatively impacts the Economy of California.

Wiener introduced SB 35 to increase housing supply and stabilize or decrease home prices. The bill is part of California's 2017 Housing Package, which are 15 small bills devoted to increasing housing affordability. Supporters hope SB 35 will shorten the permitting process for certain developments.

Housing Element Act of 1969  
The Housing Element Act of 1969 mandates all cities construct a specified number of low, middle, and market rate housing. Cities are required to construct their RHNA, which the HCD determines every 8 years. The RHNA determines the amount of low-income, moderate income, and market housing each municipality is expected to construct to meet regional housing needs. However, 97.6% of cities in California do not construct the required number of low-income housing units allocated.

Local officials, however, often disagree with state officials over what these housing production goals should be.

Opposition 

The League of California Cities and many municipal governments opposed SB 35 for imposing state control over local planning rules. City governments opposing SB 35 include: Berkeley, Beverly Hills, Encinitas, Palm Desert, Vallejo, San Luis Obispo, Huntington Beach, and Walnut Creek.

Several cities have pursued court cases to stop SB 35 following its passage. In 2019, Huntington Beach sued the State of California to stop the enforcement of SB 35. The City Attorney for Huntington Beach, Michael Gates, claims SB 35 “unconstitutionally interferes with the city’s authority to enforce local zoning laws.” In 2021, Huntington Beach lost the lawsuit and decided not to appeal.

Impact 
Some housing experts believe the impact of SB 35 on overall housing production will be minimal due to the standards required to meet streamlining approval. The bill is expected to increase below-market housing for the lowest income households. As of November 2019, officials have approved more than 6,000 homes under SB 35, including 4,700 in the Bay Area and 1,600 in Southern California.

Cities Affected by SB 35
28 cities and counties have met their lower and above moderate income RHNA. 298 jurisdictions have not created enough housing to meet their above moderate income RHNA. Projects in these jurisdictions can qualify for SB 35 housing if developments with 10% of housing units devoted to below market housing.

213 jurisdictions have not created enough housing to meet their above very low and low-income RHNA. Projects in these jurisdictions can qualify for SB 35 housing if developments with 50% of housing units devoted to below market housing.

SB 35 Projects

Vallco Mall Project  
The Vallco Shopping Mall redevelopment project in Cupertino is the largest project to have utilized SB 35. The project will include retail and 2 million square feet of office space, and 2,402 total units of housing. Half of those units, or 1,201, will be designated as below-market rate housing for low and very low-income residents. The project was approved on September 21, 2018 for streamlining under SB 35. In October 2018 the City Council approved, and residents then filed a referendum on, another Vallco project by the same developer—the 2018 Vallco Specific Plan. In May 2019 the City Council repealed the Vallco Specific Plan.

681 Florida Street 
The Mission Economic Development Agency (MEDA), an affordable housing development agency, used SB 35 to expedite construction of a 100% affordable housing development in San Francisco’s Mission District. The development will include 130 housing units devoted to low-income families; 30% of those apartments are reserved for formerly homeless families. Without SB 35, the development would have followed the normal approval process and been delayed for 6 months to a year.

Amendments 
In 2021 AB1174 was signed into law, which gives projects (like Vallco) using the special approval of SB35 more time to start construction to compensate for delays caused by lawsuits.

See also 
Affordable Housing
California Environmental Quality Act
California housing shortage
San Francisco housing shortage
California Senate Bill 827

References 

SB 35
Housing in California